Dame Caroline Dean  (born 2 April 1957) is a British plant scientist working at the John Innes Centre.  She is focused on understanding the molecular controls used by plants to seasonally judge when to flower. She is specifically interested in vernalisation — the acceleration of flowering in plants by exposure to periods of prolonged cold. She has also been on the Life Sciences jury for the Infosys Prize from 2018.

Education
Dean was educated at the University of York, where she was awarded a Bachelor of Arts degree in Biology in 1978 and a PhD. in Biology in 1982.

Research and career
Dean's research has been funded by the Biotechnology and Biological Sciences Research Council European Research Council, EU-Marie Curie and EMBO and focuses on  research on gene regulation and the intersection of chromatin, transcription and non-coding RNAs. Her goal is to understand the chromatin dynamics that enable switching between epigenetic states and quantitative regulation of gene expression. This mechanistic analysis is focused on one gene encoding the floral repressor FLC. Epigenetic switching and quantitative regulation of FLC play a central role in seasonal timing in plants.  This acceleration of flowering by prolonged cold is a classic epigenetic process called vernalisation.

FLC regulation involves an antisense-mediated chromatin mechanism that coordinately influences transcription initiation and elongation. As plants overwinter FLC expression is then epigenetically silenced through a cold-induced, cis-based, Polycomb switching mechanism. The group are mechanistically dissecting these conserved chromatin mechanisms and investigating how they have been modulated during adaptation.

She uses Arabidopsis as a reference to establish the regulatory hierarchy and then use this information to translate into other species. She was a pioneer in Arabidopsis becoming a key model organism in plant science.

Awards and honours
Her nomination for the Royal Society reads:  Other awards include:

 1993 – 2002  Honorary Research Fellow, School of Biological Sciences, University of East Anglia  
 1999 – Elected a member of the European Molecular Biology Organization (EMBO)  
 2004 – Dean was appointed office of the Dame Commander of the Order of the British Empire (DBE) and a Fellow of the Royal Society. 
 2007 – she was awarded the Genetics Society Medal 
 2008 – the United States National Academy of Sciences elected her a foreign member
 2008 – elected a member of the German National Academy of Sciences Leopoldina.
 2015 – FEBS/EMBO Women in Science Award.
 2016 – Appointed Dame Commander of the Order of the British Empire (DBE) in the 2016 Birthday Honours for services to plant science research and women in science.
 2016 – Dean was awarded with the Darwin Medal by the Royal Society for her work addressing fundamental questions in the perception of temperature cues and how modifications in epigenetic mechanisms play an important role in adaptation.
 2018 – she was awarded the L'Oréal-UNESCO For Women in Science Award
 2020 – she received the Wolf Prize in Agriculture.
2020 – awarded the Royal Society 'Royal Medal'

Personal life
Dean is married to Jonathan D. G. Jones and has one son and one daughter.

References

1957 births
Living people
Female Fellows of the Royal Society
Foreign associates of the National Academy of Sciences
20th-century British botanists
21st-century British botanists
British women biologists
Dames Commander of the Order of the British Empire
Place of birth missing (living people)
Alumni of the University of York
Academics of the University of York
Academics of the University of East Anglia
Members of the European Molecular Biology Organization
Fellows of the Royal Society
L'Oréal-UNESCO Awards for Women in Science laureates
Members of the German Academy of Sciences Leopoldina